Kammerensemble Neue Musik Berlin, also known as KNM Berlin, is a music ensemble for contemporary music based in Berlin, Germany.

The ensemble was founded in 1988 in then East Berlin by students of the Hochschule für Musik "Hanns Eisler". The players collaborated with composers such as Mark Andre, Georg Katzer, Chris Newman, Helmut Oehring, Dieter Schnebel and conductor Roland Kluttig. They are described as "a group which combines openness to the experimental music tradition with a high level of playing in the conventional mode." Musicians who have been involved with the ensemble include Barbara Buchholz, Philipp Maintz, Michael Mantler and Graham Waterhouse.

References

External links
Official site

German musical groups
Musical groups from Berlin